MaameYaa Boafo (pronounced "Mah-Mih-Yah Bwafoh") is a Pakistan-born Ghanaian actress and comedian.

Biography
Boafo was born in Pakistan. She is of Ashanti (Ghanaian) ethnicity. She was raised in Sudan, Ethiopia, Geneva and Kenya, but is a citizen of Ghana. In 2001, after graduating from high school, Boafo travelled to the United States to study French and communication.

After graduating from Hood College in 2015, she received a scholarship to study acting at Rutgers University and earned her master's degree in 2019. Boafo did a study abroad semester at Marc Bloch University in Strasbourg, France.

Boafo made her acting debut as Asa in the 2012 short film Asa, A Beautiful Girl. In 2014, Boafo began portraying Nana Yaa in Nicole Amarteifio's web TV series An African City. Her character is a journalist who struggles to afford rent in Accra, analogous to Carrie Bradshaw in Sex and the City. Boafo noticed the role on a Facebook page, and because she was travelling she sent a videotaped audition to Amarteifio, who called a week later.

In 2014, she starred in Bus Nut, an experimental short film in which she read the words from the trial of Rosa Parks. It premiered at the San Francisco Film Festival.

In 2015, Boafo had a small role in The Family Fang. She appeared in the short films New York, I Love You and Olive in 2016. From 2017 to 2018, she starred as Paulina in the play School Girls, which was inspired by Mean Girls.

Boafo was nominated for the Lucille Lortell Award and the Los Angeles Drama Circle Award for best actor, and received the Drama Desk award for her performance. She played HIV patient Abena Kwemo in a 2018 episode of Chicago Med. In 2019, she played private investigator Briana Logan in the TV series Bluff City Law. Boafo portrayed Zainab in the TV series Ramy in 2020.

Boafo made a video in reaction to the death of Freddie Gray in Baltimore titled "As Nina", as she reportedly bears a resemblance to the late singer Nina Simone. In addition to English, she speaks Twi.

Filmography

Film

Television

References

External links
MaameYaa Boafo at the Internet Movie Database

Year of birth missing (living people)
Living people
Ghanaian film actresses
Ghanaian television actresses
21st-century Ghanaian actresses
Rutgers University alumni
Hood College alumni